KHDY may refer to:

 KHDY (AM), a radio station (1350 AM) licensed to serve Clarksville, Texas, United States
 KHDY-FM, a radio station (98.5 FM) licensed to serve Clarksville, Texas